Rise of the Imperial Hordes is the first studio album by black metal band Krieg. It was recorded in October & November 1997 at Vortex Sound Studio. Blood Fire Death re-issued the album in 2001 with a Havohej cover, "Enlightened Ones", as bonus track. Zerstorungs Produktionen re-issued it in 2005; this re-issue was limited to 999 copies.

Track listing

Note
The original track listing only includes the first eleven songs. The twelfth song appears as bonus track in the Blood Fire Death re-issue.

Personnel
Lord Imperial – guitar, vocals, keyboards on track 5
Lord Soth – bass, guitars, vocals, keyboards on track 9
Ted Tringo – keyboards
Teloc Koraxo – drums

1998 albums
Krieg (band) albums